"Kalinka" is a Russian folk song written in 1860 by the composer and folklorist Ivan Larionov and first performed in Saratov as part of a theatrical entertainment that he had composed. Soon it was added to the repertory of a folk choral group.

Song
The refrain of the song  refers to the kalinka, which is the snowball tree (Viburnum opulus). It has a speedy tempo and light-hearted lyrics. The main refrain (Kalinka, Kalinka ...) increases in tempo each time it is sung. One of the best-known singers of this song was Evgeny Belyaev (1926–1994).

Lyrics sample

Recordings and cultural influence

Kalinka is considered one of the most famous Russian folk and folk-style songs in Russia, and all over the world. 

Instrumental organ versions of this song can be found playing in North American ice hockey arenas. 

It appeared in the 1953 film Tonight We Sing, performed by Italian-American operatic bass and actor Ezio Pinza. The film was a semi-biography of Russian bass Feodor Chaliapin who famously sang and, during the early days of recording, recorded the song for HMV/Victor. Pinza's recording was included on the 10-inch LP soundtrack album release of the same year, coincidentally from RCA Victor.

In 1962 it was sung in the Hollywood movie Taras Bulba, a movie based on Nikolai Gogol's novel, set in 16th century Ukraine, starring Yul Brynner and Tony Curtis, although the lyrics were completely altered to fit the scene.

In Atari's 1988 version of Tetris, Kalinka is featured as one of its theme songs; however, it is labelled "KARINKA" in the NES version. Since then, Kalinka has often been included in licensed Tetris games, alongside Korobeiniki and Troika, the former of which is now commonly known as "the Tetris theme".

In 1991, the musically-themed Mega Man video game series' fourth installment introduced a Russian character by the name of Kalinka.

In 1993 the Welsh tenor Wynford Evans sang "Kalinka" at Cardiff Arms Park Stadium accompanied by the largest ever male choir of 10,000 voices, known as the World Choir. 

In 1998 the Danish band Infernal made the song popular in Scandinavia. 

In the 2000 OVA Labyrinth of Flames, both episodes contain the song as their ending theme. 

In 2001 or 2002, German band Yamboo made the song popular in Eastern Europe, and has also became a Meme.

In 2003, Roman Abramovich bought Chelsea FC. Since then, "Kalinka" is often played before or after important matches, including the Champions League clashes with FC Barcelona and the League Cup final.

In 2008, the Russian singer Alexey Vorobyov also had a song called "New Russian Kalinka" (in English) and "Novaya Ruskaya Kalinka" (in Russian), which is a cover of the song. 

A balalaika version of "Kalinka" can be found in a record shop, at the map "Terminal", in the game Call of Duty: Modern Warfare 2, released by Activision in 2009. 

The Alexandrov Ensemble performed the song alongside circus performers during the interval of the Eurovision Song Contest 2009 semi-final.

In 2010, Russian countertenor Vitas covered the song on his album Masterpieces of Three Centuries. 

The same balalaika version of "Kalinka" from Call of Duty: Modern Warfare 2 can also be heard in the record shop, at the map "Terminal", in the game Call of Duty: Modern Warfare 3, released by Activision in 2011. 

The 2011 Hindi film 7 Khoon Maaf directed by Vishal Bhardwaj features a track called 'Darling' and 'Doosri Darling' which is a cover with its own lyrics in Hindi. 

On the Italian television show Non è la RAI, Russian contestant Yelyena Mirzoyan performed the song during the third season. 

In the 2013, Season 2 episode, "A Father's Love", of the American sitcom New Girl, Nick's con-man father involves Jess and Nick in a scheme with Russian horse sperm dealers. A nervous Nick begins to sweat profusely when he meets the intimidating dealers. To prove that he is not a cop wearing a wire, the men force Nick to remove his clothes and dance while they mockingly clap rhythmically and sing Kalinka.

In the video game Payday 2, released in 2013, "Kalinka" is sometimes sung by Vlad after completing the Four Stores heist.

In the video game Tom Clancy's Rainbow Six Siege, released in 2015, "Kalinka" is used in the introductory video of Tachanka.

In the video game Civilization VI, released in 2016, "Kalinka" is the theme of the Russian civilization, played when the civilization is present in a game. As the player progresses throughout the different civilization eras, additional complexity and layers are added.

"Kalinka" has been played during the closing ceremony of the 2018 FIFA World Cup in Russia by Russian soprano singer Aida Garifullina, featuring the famous former football player Ronaldinho.

In 2020, it was remixed by Timmy Trumpet, Wolfpack, R3SPAWN and Jaxx & Vega, and published, as an edit by Dimitri Vegas & Like Mike, on the latter's label Smash The House.

In 2021, קאטליה (Cattleya) by Omer Adam and Skazi sampled it.

Mr Kalinka
The arrangement of Kalinka which is traditionally performed by the Alexandrov Ensemble turned the frivolous song into an operatic aria. The first ensemble soloist to perform this was Pyotr Tverdokhlebov, but the first to earn the title of Mr Kalinka was Victor Ivanovich Nikitin at the Berlin peace concert of August 1948, where he sang three encores of the song. The title is unofficial and awarded by the audience and journalists present at successful Ensemble concerts where Kalinka earns numerous encores. A definitive recording of Kalinka was made in 1963 at the Abbey Road Studios, London by the lyric tenor Evgeny Belyaev, with the Alexandrov Ensemble, under the direction of Boris Alexandrovich Alexandrov.  Belyaev earned the Mr Kalinka title at the London concerts of 1956 and 1963. Since then there have been several Mr Kalinkas, including Vasily Ivanovich Shtefutsa and Vadim Petrovich Ananyev.

References

Further reading
Сергей Сергиевский. "Печать неизмеримой самобытности", Независимая газета, 26.11.1999
Russian folk song and dance Kalinka, at Barynya

External links

Youtube performance of Kalinka
 Music sheet of Kalinka

Russian folk songs
1860 songs
Lidia Ruslanova songs
Fictional trees
Songs about trees
Soviet songs